Victor Miguel Pacheco Mendez (born Dominican Republic, June 9, 1982) is a Dominican businessman and entrepreneur, considered the originator of modern commercial aviation in the Dominican Republic. From a very young age he was interested in the world of finance and entrepreneurship where he was introduced  by his grandfather Víctor Méndez Capellán, he is currently the founder of Arajet and Laytrip. With the idea of transforming commercial flying in the Dominican Republic, both companies are designed to support tourism to and from the Dominican Republic and countries in the available routes. With this new traffic, direct and indirect employment opportunities will be available and have a significant positive impact on the regional and national economy.

Education
Pacheco completed elementary school at Carol Morgan School and later continued his secondary studies at Riverside Military Academy, Georgia. Most recently, he graduated from Universidad Iberoamericana with a bachelor's degree in Business Administration.

Career
He has started his career in finance and administration. Within the financial and banking sector, in charge of many strategic executive positions, has become a business executive with an extensive background in the aviation and financial services industry. This experience has made him an expert in Negotiation, Strategic Planning, Airlines and Commercial Strategy, fintech and technological development.

In August 2015 Victor Miguel Pacheco got certifications for the initiation of flying operations from the Instituto Dominicano de Aviación Civil (IDAC) and the Junta de Aviación Civil (JAC). 

By June 28, 2017, Mr. Víctor Miguel Pacheco, founder of the company now known as Arajet holds the position of Chief Executive Officer of Arajet, first low-cost carrier in the Dominican Republic.

In November 2021, he became chairman of Laytrip, Inc., a worldwide Layaway travel provider, where users can search thousands of real-time flight and hotel listings and book any combination of travel itineraries all from a simple one-stop-travel platform.

During the launch ceremony of the Arajet airline on March 14, 2022, Victor Pacheco announced his alliance as a strategic partner with Bain Capital, one of the world’s leading private multi-asset alternative investment firms and Griffin Global Asset Management, a commercial aircraft leasing and alternative asset management company, to support Arajet team’s growth plans and mission.

On May 12, 2022, ARAJET and Aeropuertos Dominicanos Siglo XXI (AERODOM) - a subsidiary of VINCI Airports - signed an agreement to establish the José Francisco Peña Gómez International Airport of the Americas (AILA-JFPG) in the city of Santo Domingo as their operational base. Thanks to the signed agreement, the AILA-JFPG serves as ARAJET's home base. In practice, this means that they are basing their aircraft and crews there and will have the city of Santo Domingo as a departure point for all flights. Aircraft will, as a rule, return there for overnight stays if the duration of the flight permits.

On May 24, 2022, the president of El Salvador, Nayib Bukele, met with the president of ARAJET, Victor Pacheco, and the main aeronautical authorities of the Dominican Republic, where they agreed to begin work so that Arajet, can start direct operations to San Salvador at the end of the year through the Las Americas International Airport (AILA). According to Victor Pacheco, currently the connection between San Salvador and Santo Domingo takes an average of 10 to 14 hours with stopovers in different cities in the region, at a cost of approximately US$1,000. Arajet's direct flights will reduce that time to only three hours, with prices between 30% to 60% lower than those of the market.

On June 20, 2022, Arajet was formally certified by the Dominican Institute of Civil Aviation (IDAC) as a flight operator in the DR. This certification authorizes them to start commercial air transport operations, as an instrument of operational safety. With this milestone for national aviation, the country will strengthen its air connectivity, boosting key sectors of the national economy such as trade and tourism, among others.

On September 13, 2022, Arajet received two new and modern aircraft named "Jaragua" and "Ojos Indígenas", thus completing a fleet of 4 aircraft, names that honor the main protected areas of the country and reaffirm its commitment to the conservation of the environment and natural resources, with a fleet of aircraft that will save on fuel costs, maintenance and operations, allowing to transfer these savings to its passengers, while reducing noise pollution.

On August 8, 2022, Arajet formally and officially opens its sales to the public on www.arajet.com, offering the lowest fares in the national market, thus initiating what will soon become the democratization of national aviation.

With the start of October 2022, Arajet had already opened 7 new routes within The Americas, this is a milestone never been seen before for a Dominican airline.

By the end of 2022, Arajet had surpassed all expectations within the first three and a half months of its founding. It is the first Dominican airline with 17 destinations in 11 countries in The Americas with direct flights at an ultra-low rate. ARAJET has been profiled as the most efficient, reliable and safe airline in the Caribbean region. 

Arajet´s carrier now operates with 5ive new Boeing 737-8s, making it the third airline in the Caribbean to own one of the Boeing 737 MAX models after Cayman Airways and Caribbean Airlines. However, Boeing and Arajet signed a new deal for 20 B737 MAX 8 aircraft (plus options for 15 more).

References

Further reading 
 
 

1982 births
Living people
People from Santo Domingo
Dominican Republic chairpersons of corporations